This is a list of notable Protestant missionaries in China by agency. Beginning with the arrival of Robert Morrison in 1807 and ending in 1953 with the departure of Arthur Matthews and Dr. Rupert Clark of the China Inland Mission, thousands of foreign Protestant missionaries and their families, lived and worked in China to spread Christianity, establish schools, and work as medical missionaries.

Missionary organizations

American Board of Commissioners for Foreign Missions

American Presbyterian Mission

American Southern Presbyterian Mission

American Methodist Episcopal Mission

American Southern Methodist Mission

American Southern Baptist Mission

China Inland Mission

Church Missionary Society

English Presbyterian Mission

London Missionary Society

Mission Covenant Church of Sweden

Protestant Episcopal Church Mission
A list of missionaries of the Episcopal Church (United States) a member Province of the worldwide Anglican Communion that served in China from 1835.

In 1912, Episcopal Church missionary activities in China were reorganized with Anglican mission initiatives of the Church of England and other Anglican provinces under the banner of the Chung Hua Sheng Kung Hui.

English Baptist Missionary Society

Protestant missionaries affiliated with other agencies

See also
 List of Protestant missionary societies in China (1807–1953)
 Church Missionary Society in China
 List of Roman Catholic missionaries in China
 List of Christian missionaries
 Timeline of Christian missions
 Chefoo School
 Lammermuir Party
 Thomas Richardson Colledge
 Grace Dyer Taylor
 Murders of John and Betty Stam
 Kenneth Scott Latourette
 George S. Benson

References

Further reading
 Anderson, Gerald H. (ed.), Biographical Dictionary of Christian Mission, Macmillan Reference, 1998
 Broomhall, AJ, Hudson Taylor and China's Open Century Vols. I, II, III, London: Hodder & Stoughton, 1981
 Fulton, Austin Through Earthquake Wind and Fire; Church and mission in Manchuria 1867-1950: the work of the United Presbyterian Church, the United Free Church of Scotland, the Church of Scotland and the Presbyterian Church in Ireland with the Chinese Church in Manchuria. Edinburgh: St Andrew Press. 1967.  Lists all Church of Scotland, Presbyterian Church of England and Presbyterian Church in Ireland missionaries from 1867 to 1950. (Contains listing of all their missionaries.)
 Griffiths, Valerie, Not Less Than Everything, Oxford: Monarch Books & OMF International, 2004
 Latourette, Kenneth Scott, A History of Christian Missions in China, London: Society for Promoting Christian Knowledge, 1929
 Lovett, Richard, The History of the London Missionary Society 1795 – 1895 Vol. II, London: Henry Frowde, 1899
 Shorrock, Arthur, Shensi in Sunshine and Shade, Shanghai: Presbyterian Mission Press, 1926
 Sibree, James, Register of LMS Missionaries, 1796–1923, London: LMS, 1923

External links
 Biographical Dictionary of Chinese Christianity
 Missionaries in Amoy (primarily with the RCA)
 Amoy Mission Project
 List of articles regarding Fuzhou's Christian history

List
19th century in China
20th century in China
Protestant missionaries in China
China Protestant
Protestant missions
Protestant missions